Funny Girl is a 1968 American biographical musical comedy-drama film directed by William Wyler and written by Isobel Lennart, adapted from her book for the stage musical of the same title. It is loosely based on the life and career of Broadway and film star and comedienne Fanny Brice and her stormy relationship with entrepreneur and gambler Nicky Arnstein.

Produced by Brice's son-in-law, Ray Stark (and the first film by his company Rastar), with music and lyrics by Jule Styne and Bob Merrill, the film stars Barbra Streisand (in her film debut reprising her Broadway role) as Brice and Omar Sharif as Arnstein, with a supporting cast featuring Kay Medford, Anne Francis, Walter Pidgeon, Lee Allen and Mae Questel.

A major critical and commercial success, Funny Girl became the highest-grossing film of 1968 in the United States and received eight Academy Award nominations. Streisand won Best Actress, tying with Katharine Hepburn (The Lion in Winter). In 2006, the American Film Institute ranked the film #16 on its list commemorating AFI's Greatest Movie Musicals. Previously it had ranked the film #41 in its 2002 list of AFI's 100 Years...100 Passions, the songs "People" and "Don't Rain on My Parade" at #13 and #46, respectively, in its 2004 list of AFI's 100 Years...100 Songs, and the line "Hello, gorgeous" at #81 in its 2005 list of AFI's 100 Years...100 Movie Quotes. Funny Girl is considered one of the greatest musical films ever made.

In 2016, Funny Girl was deemed "culturally, historically, or aesthetically significant" by the United States Library of Congress, and selected for preservation in the National Film Registry.

Plot
Set in and around New York City just prior to and following World War I, the story opens with Ziegfeld Follies star Fanny Brice awaiting her husband Nicky Arnstein to arrive at the theater, and then moves into an extended flashback focusing on their meeting, marriage, and Fanny's rise to stardom.

Fanny is a stage-struck teenager who lands her first job in vaudeville. Her mother and her friend, Mrs. Strakosh, try to dissuade Fanny from show business, believing Fanny is not a stage beauty. Fanny's boss complains about Fanny's unsynchronized dancing skills and appearance, wanting to sack her. She perseveres and is put in a roller-skating act after falsely claiming she can skate. The performance goes wrong, but the audience thinks that Fanny is hilarious and cheer her singing. After the show, the suave Nicky Arnstein comes backstage to meet Fanny. She finds Nicky handsome and charming, but declines his invitation for dinner. 

Fanny's dream is realized when, six months later, she is hired for the Ziegfeld Follies. In her debut performance, Fanny is cast as the beautiful bride in a romantic musical number. Uncomfortable about her looks, she adds a comic twist by appearing pregnant in the wedding gown. An angry Ziegfeld wants to fire Fanny but the audience loves the hilarious act. He tells her to play it that way every performance. Nicky Arnstein appears and congratulates Fanny on her success, then accompanies her to the Brice family celebration.

Within a year, Fanny is a Broadway star. While on tour, she runs into Nicky in Baltimore. During a romantic dinner, they declare their mutual romantic feelings. The reunion is cut short after Nicky's racehorse loses a big race, leaving him broke. To make money, Nicky heads for Europe to gamble during the voyage. Fanny impulsively quits the tour and rushes back to New York to join him. A tugboat takes her to Nicky's ship, which just left port. Nicky is delighted to see Fanny. During the trip, Nicky wins a fortune playing poker. The two eventually marry and move into a mansion and soon have a daughter. Fanny later returns to the Ziegfeld Follies.

When Nicky's various business ventures fail, he resorts to gambling to recoup his losses. This causes him to miss Fanny's new premiere, further straining their marriage. Fanny's mother tells an unknowing Fanny about Nicky's dire financial situation and advises her to, "love him less and help him more". Nicky is offered a lucrative business venture, but he quickly realizes Fanny is secretly financing the deal and rejects it. He instead becomes involved in a bonds scam. Nicky is caught and sentenced to eighteen months in prison for embezzlement. 

The film shifts back to the present timeline as Fanny nervously awaits Nicky's return from prison. Nicky arrives, and, after a bittersweet reunion, the two agree to separate, leaving Fanny heartbroken.

Cast

Production

Development

Isobel Lennart originally wrote Funny Girl as a screenplay for a drama film entitled My Man for producer Ray Stark (whose mother-in-law was Fanny Brice). No studio or producers were interested in the project, except for Vincent Donhue, who suggested turning it into a stage musical. Lennart consequently adapted her script for what eventually became a successful Broadway production starring Barbra Streisand.

Although she had not made any films, Streisand was Stark's first and only choice to portray Brice onscreen. "I just felt she was too much a part of Fanny, and Fanny was too much a part of Barbra to have it go to someone else," he said, but Columbia Pictures executives wanted Shirley MacLaine in the role instead. MacLaine and Streisand were good friends and shared a birthday; both actresses rolled their eyes at the idea. Stark insisted if Streisand were not cast, he would not allow a film to be made, and the studio agreed to his demand.

Mike Nichols, George Roy Hill, and Gene Kelly were considered to direct the film before Sidney Lumet was signed. After working on pre-production for six months, he left the project due to "creative differences" and was replaced by William Wyler, whose long and illustrious award-winning career never had included a musical film; he originally was assigned to direct The Sound of Music. Wyler initially declined Stark's offer because he was concerned his significant hearing loss would affect his ability to work on a musical. After giving it some thought, he told Stark, "If Beethoven could write his Eroica Symphony, then William Wyler can do a musical."

Streisand had never heard of Wyler, and when she was told he had won the Academy Award for Best Director for Ben-Hur, she commented, "Chariots! How is he with people, like women? Is he any good with actresses?" In fact Wyler had directed Roman Holiday (1953) which won three Academy Awards including the Best Actress award for Audrey Hepburn who had been chosen by Wyler despite her relative obscurity at that time. As for Wyler, he said, "I wouldn't have done the picture without her." Her enthusiasm reminded him of Bette Davis, and he felt she "represented a challenge for me because she's never been in films, and she's not the usual glamour girl".

Casting

Styne wanted Frank Sinatra for the role of Nicky Arnstein, but the actor was willing to appear in the film only if the role was expanded and new songs were added for the character. Stark thought Sinatra was too old and preferred someone with more class like Cary Grant, even though Grant was eleven years older than Sinatra. Marlon Brando, Gregory Peck, Sean Connery, David Janssen, and James Garner were also considered. Egyptian Omar Sharif was cast to star opposite the Jewish Streisand after Wyler noticed him having lunch in the studio commissary. When the Six-Day War between Israel and Egypt broke out, studio executives considered replacing Sharif, but both Wyler and Streisand threatened to quit if they did. Later, the publication of a still depicting a love scene between Fanny and Nicky in the Egyptian press prompted a movement to revoke Sharif's citizenship. When asked about the controversy, Streisand replied, "You think Cairo got upset? You should see the letter I got from my Aunt Rose!" Anne Francis was cast in a new role as the lead chorine in the Ziegfeld Follies.

Choreographer Herbert Ross, who staged the musical numbers, had worked with Streisand in I Can Get It for You Wholesale, her Broadway debut.

Filming

Rehearsals and pre-recording of the songs began in July 1967. During pre-recording, Streisand had demanded extensive retakes until she was satisfied with them, and on the set she continued to display her perfectionist nature, frequently arguing with Wyler about costumes and photography.

Principal photography began in August 1967 and was completed by December. Streisand's first scene took place at an abandoned rail depot in New Jersey where she just got off from the train and posing for the photographers. Filming was more difficult for Barbra than she thought because she had to do musical numbers multiple times for different camera angles. For the helicopter shot of "Don't Rain on My Parade", aerial photographer Nelson Tyler had to develop a special helicopter camera rig. Streisand allegedly had so many of her scenes with Anne Francis cut before the film's release that Francis sued to have her name removed from the credits, but lost. Streisand later claimed she never told Wyler to cut anything and the final film reflected his choices, not hers. Francis later said "I have no feud with Barbra. But doing that film was like Gaslight. What infuriated me was the way they did things—never telling me, never talking to me, just cutting. I think they were afraid that if they were nice to me, Barbra would have been upset." Shooting for the musical number "My Man", which the original Fanny Brice made famous, took place at the end of the shooting phase. Sharif was present to help Streisand get emotional and build up sadness. The crew did at least ten takes. Also in that shoot, Stark thought the film would cost $8 million, which he deemed to be "half as much as any other big musical [...] and it will be twice as big."

Release
Prior to release, Columbia Pictures produced 3 featurettes for publicity ― "This Is Streisand", "Barbra in Movieland" and "The Look of Funny Girl".

Music

 "Overture"
 "If a Girl Isn't Pretty" – Mrs. Strakosh, Rose and Fanny
 "I'm the Greatest Star" – Fanny
 "Rollerskate Rag" – Fanny and Rollerskate Girls
 "I'd Rather Be Blue Over You (Than Happy With Somebody Else)" – Fanny
 "Second Hand Rose" – Fanny
 "His Love Makes Me Beautiful" – Fanny and Follies Ensemble
 "People" – Fanny
 "You Are Woman, I Am Man" – Nicky and Fanny
 "Don't Rain on My Parade" – Fanny
 "Entr'acte"
 "Sadie, Sadie" – Fanny and Nicky
 "The Swan" – Fanny
 "Funny Girl" – Fanny
 "My Man" – Fanny
 "Exit Music"

Funny Girl originally had 18 musical numbers in 160 minutes of film, 60 minutes of which are tuned. Arnstein used to have a solo called "Temporary Arrangement". Seven numbers from the original musical production were removed, while "Rollerskate Rag", "The Swan" and "Funny Girl" are composed specifically for Streisand and are unrelated to Brice.

Although originally released on her 1964 album People, the song "People" was re-recorded for the film with a different tempo and additional lyrics. Because "My Man", "Second Hand Rose" and "I'd Rather Be Blue" were frequent in Brice's career, they were interpolated into the score.

In the 1985 book Barbra Streisand: The Woman, the Myth, the Music by Shaun Considine, Styne revealed he was unhappy with the film's orchestrations. "They were going for pop arrangements," he recalled. "They dropped eight songs from the Broadway show and we were asked to write some new ones. They didn't want to go with success. It was the old-fashioned MGM Hollywood way of doing a musical. They always change things to their way of vision, and they always do it wrong. But, of all my musicals they screwed up, Funny Girl came out the best."

Soundtrack 

The soundtrack album to the film was released by Columbia Records in 1968.

Box office
Funny Girl premiered on September 18, 1968 at the Criterion Theatre in New York; whose ticket cost $100. It was Streisand's first premiere as a movie star, and she said she felt like a "kid with a plaything". The Hollywood premiere was held on October 9, 1968 at the Egyptian Theatre. Having grossed $24.9 million, Funny Girl was the highest-grossing film of 1968 in the United States.

Critical reception
The film holds a 94% approval rating on review aggregation site Rotten Tomatoes, based on 47 reviews, with an average rating of 7.6/10. The website's critical consensus states: "[Barbra] Streisand elevates this otherwise rote melodramatic musical with her ultra-memorable star turn as Fanny Brice." On Metacritic, it has an 89 out of 100 rating, based on 7 critics, indicating "universal acclaim". Streisand was widely praised by critics, with The New Yorkers Pauline Kael calling it "A bravura performance .... As Fanny Brice, she has the wittiest comic inflections since the comediennes of the 30s; she makes written dialogue sound like inspired improvisation. ... Streisand's triumphant talent rides right over the film's weaknesses." In his review in Chicago Sun-Times, Roger Ebert called Streisand "magnificent" and added, "She has the best timing since Mae West, and is more fun to watch than anyone since the young Katharine Hepburn. She doesn't actually sing a song at all; she acts it. She does things with her hands and face that are simply individual; that's the only way to describe them. They haven't been done before. She sings, and you're really happy you're there." But he thought "the film itself is perhaps the ultimate example of the roadshow musical gone overboard. It is over-produced, over-photographed and over-long. The second half drags badly. The supporting characters are generally wooden . . . That makes the movie itself kind of schizo. It is impossible to praise Miss Streisand too highly; hard to find much to praise about the rest of the film." Richard L. Coe of The Washington Post agreed that the film was "overdone," writing that Streisand was "her first-rate self" during the musical numbers and "probably is capable of more variety than this," but "is so carefully presented and limited that she and the picture become a long, drippy bore." Renata Adler of The New York Times wrote that "Streisand's talent is very poignant and strong," but that the film had "something a little condescending about it," with Wyler "treating Barbra rather fondly, improbably and even patronizingly," and concluded that "Miss Streisand doesn't need any of this."

Variety said Streisand makes "a marked impact" and continued, "The saga of the tragi-comedienne Fanny Brice of the ungainly mien and manner, charmed by the suave card-sharp Nicky Arnstein, is perhaps of familiar pattern, but it is to the credit of all concerned that it plays so convincingly."

Jan Dawson of The Monthly Film Bulletin wrote, "The story of the actress whose dramatic rise from rags to riches is accompanied by the discovery that suffering lies on the flip-side of success has provided the basis of many an American musical. But William Wyler manages to transcend the clichés of the genre and create—largely through Barbra Streisand's characterisation of Fanny Brice—a dramatic comedy in which the musical numbers illustrate the public aspect of the star's life without once interrupting the narrative."

David Parkinson of Empire rated the film four out of five stars in a retrospective review and called it "one of those films where it doesn't really matter what gets written here – you will have made your mind up about Babs one way or the other, but for the rare uninitiated, this is a fine introduction to her talents." It is Funny Girl that made Streisand a movie star, although it also gave her the reputation for being perfectionist and 'difficult'. According to film historian Jeanine Basinger, this film helped Streisand to be regarded as a "funny girl" in her own way, and not another actress who played Fanny Brice.

Awards and nominations
Funny Girl garnered eight Academy Award nominations, ultimately winning Streisand an Oscar as Best Actress for her film debut. In an Academy Award upset that has never been repeated, Streisand's win was a tie vote with Katherine Hepburn, who also won Best Actress for A Lion in Winter. Along with Columbia's other Best Picture nominee and eventual winner Oliver!, the studio secured a combined total of nineteen Academy Award nominations, the most nominations for musicals from one studio in a year. Streisand won Best Actress at the Golden Globe Awards, while Funny Girl garnered three additional nominations.

Home media
The film was released on region 1 DVD on October 23, 2001. A Blu-ray edition released on April 30, 2013 with the same bonus material as the DVD. The Blu-ray was concurrent with Streisand's then-recent film, The Guilt Trip.

Legacy

Jewish representation
In her book Talking Back: Images of Jewish Women in American Popular Culture, Joyce Antler writes that Streisand has created several rich images of a Jewish woman within film, Funny Girl being one of them. In Funny Girl, Antler writes,  During the time the film was made, Jewish women had the stereotype of being dependent upon men, yet Streisand tends to defy this stereotype.

"Hello, gorgeous"
"Hello, gorgeous" are the first words uttered by Streisand in the film. Upon winning the Academy Award for Best Actress, Streisand's first comment when handed the Oscar statuette was to look at the Oscar and say "Hello, gorgeous."

Since release, "Hello, gorgeous" has been referenced in several films. The line appeared as the name of the salon where Michelle Pfeiffer's character worked in Married to the Mob. The line was also uttered by the character Max Bialystock in the 1967 film The Producers and its Broadway adaptation, but the inflection used by Zero Mostel is different from that used by Streisand. The line is also regularly peppered through popular culture.

Sean Harris may be known for playing darker characters in series such as Southcliffe or The Borgias, but he says that he was inspired to become an actor when he saw Barbra Streisand in Funny Girl.

In 2005, the line was chosen as #81 on the American Film Institute list, AFI's 100 Years...100 Movie Quotes.

Sequel 

In 1975, Streisand reprised her role of Brice opposite James Caan as Brice's third husband, impresario Billy Rose, in a sequel entitled Funny Lady. Production began in April 1974, the film premiered in March 1975 to mixed reviews from critics.

See also
 List of American films of 1968

Notes

References

Bibliography

External links

 
 
 
 
 
 
 

1968 films
1968 comedy-drama films
1968 musical comedy films
1968 romantic comedy films
1960s American films
1960s biographical drama films
1960s English-language films
1960s musical comedy-drama films
1960s romantic comedy-drama films
1960s romantic musical films
American biographical drama films
American musical comedy-drama films
American romantic comedy-drama films
American romantic musical films
Backstage musicals
Biographical films about entertainers
Columbia Pictures films
Comedy-drama films based on actual events
Films about mother–daughter relationships
Films about musical theatre
Films based on musicals
Films directed by William Wyler
Films featuring a Best Actress Academy Award-winning performance
Films featuring a Best Musical or Comedy Actress Golden Globe winning performance
Films scored by Walter Scharf
Films set in Baltimore
Films set in New York City
Films set in the 1910s
Films set in the 1920s
Films shot in New Jersey
Musical films based on actual events
Romance films based on actual events
United States National Film Registry films